The 1935 Shinchiku-Taichū earthquake occurred with a Richter magnitude of 7.1 (7.0 Mw) in April 1935 with its epicenter in Taichung, Taiwan (then Shinchiku Prefecture).  It was the deadliest earthquake in Taiwan's recorded history, claiming 3,276 lives and causing extensive damage. Twelve seconds after the mainshock, an aftershock of  6.0 occurred, centered on Gabi Village (present-day Emei Township, Hsinchu County).

Earthquake
The initial shock happened at 06:02 local time on 21 April 1935. The quake was felt all over Taiwan apart from Hengchun on the southern tip of the island, as well as in Fuzhou and Xiamen, China, across the Taiwan Strait. Soil liquefaction was observed in various locations, and a 3 m (10 ft) drop between the two sides of the fault was in evidence at Gabi Village. The most serious damage from the quake was located in Shinchiku Prefecture and Taichū Prefecture (present-day Miaoli County and Taichung) over a  area.

A number of aftershocks followed the main quake, with the largest registering 6.0 with an epicentre at Gabi.

Damage
The earthquake was the deadliest in Taiwan's recorded history.  The official reports cite the following figures for deaths, injuries and damage:
Deaths: 3,276
Injuries: 12,053
Houses destroyed: 17,907
Houses damaged: 36,781
The infrastructure of the island also sustained severe damage, with transportation, communications, and water networks heavily compromised.

Reported portents
Residents in central Taiwan reported that several days before the earthquake there were "signs in the sky" of impending disaster, while locals from Kiyomizu Town, Taichū Prefecture (modern-day Qingshui, Taichung) near the epicentre, reported water boiling in ground wells an hour before the shock.

Response
The great number of casualties in the earthquake prompted a review of safety standards, with the colonial Japanese government implementing building codes of a similar standard to those in force in Japan in the wake of the disaster. Locals were apparently appreciative of the efforts of Japanese policemen in recovering bodies, given local superstitions against touching the dead.

See also
 List of earthquakes in 1935
 List of earthquakes in Taiwan

Notes

References

External links

Hsinchu-taichung Earthquake, 1935
Hsinchu-Taichung
Hsinchu County
Taichung
Miaoli County
Earthquakes in Taiwan